The 1881 Quebec general election was held on December 2, 1881, to elect members of the 5th Legislative Assembly for the Province of Quebec, Canada.  The Quebec Conservative Party, led by Premier Joseph-Adolphe Chapleau, defeated the Quebec Liberal Party, led by Henri-Gustave Joly de Lotbinière.

Results

See also
 List of Quebec premiers
 Politics of Quebec
 Timeline of Quebec history
 List of Quebec political parties
 5th Legislative Assembly of Quebec

Quebec general election
Elections in Quebec
General election
Quebec general election